Yelling is the sixth studio album by Hong Kong singer Kay Tse, released on 23 April 2009. It was released in two versions, each including a bonus CD with music videos.

Track listing
吶喊 (Yelling)
字裡行奸 (Raping With Words)
直角等於三角 (Right Angle Equals to Triangle)
祝英台 (Zhu Yingtai, Butterfly Lovers)
年度之歌  (Song of the Year)
紅衣天使 (Red Clothed Angel)
方玲霞 (Fong Ling Ha)
我最喜愛的歌  (My Favorite Song)
歡送會 (國) (Farewell Party - Mandarin version of Wedding Invitation Street)
開卷快樂 (Happy Reading)

Bonus CD with music videos
吶喊  (Yelling)
祝英台  (Zhu Yingtai, Bufferfly Lovers)
年度之歌   (Song of the Year)
囍帖街  (Wedding Invitation Street)
17度  (17 Degrees)
十字架  (Crucifix)
鍾無艷 (Wu Yen)
3/8
神奇女俠的退休生活 (Retired Life of the Wonder Woman)
節外生枝 (Obstacles)
第一天  (First Day)
後窗知己 (Rear Window Soulmate)

Kay Tse albums
2009 albums
Cinepoly Records albums